Rzędowie  is a settlement in the administrative district of Gmina Nowa Brzeźnica, within Pajęczno County, Łódź Voivodeship, in central Poland.

The settlement has a population of 22.

References

Villages in Pajęczno County